A membrane keyboard is a computer keyboard whose "keys" are not separate, moving parts, as with the majority of other keyboards, but rather are pressure pads that have only outlines and symbols printed on a flat, flexible surface. Very little, if any, tactile feedback is felt when using such a keyboard.

Membrane keyboards work by electrical contact between the keyboard surface and the underlying circuits when keytop areas are pressed. These models were used with some early 1980s home computers, enjoying wide adoption in consumer electronics devices. The keyboards are quite inexpensive to mass-produce, and are more resistant against dirt and liquids than most other keyboards. However, due to a low or non-existent tactile feedback, most people have difficulty typing with them, especially when larger numbers of characters are being typed. Chiclet keyboards were a slight improvement, at least allowing individual keys to be felt to some extent.

Aside from early hobbyist/kit/home computers and some video game consoles, membrane-based QWERTY keyboards are used in some industrial computer systems, and are also found as portable, even "rollable-collapsible" designs for PDAs and other pocket computing devices. Smaller, specialised membrane keyboards, typically numeric-and-a-few-control-keys only, have been used in access control systems (for buildings and restricted areas), simple handheld calculators, domestic remote control keypads, microwave ovens, and other similar devices where the amount of typing is relatively small or infrequent, such as cell phones.

Modern PC keyboards are essentially a membrane keyboard mechanism covered with an array of dome switches which give positive tactile feedback.

Mechanism 

The membrane keyboard consists of three layers; two of these are membrane layers containing conductive traces. The center layer is a "spacer" containing holes wherever a "key" exists. It keeps the other two layers separated.

Under normal conditions, the switch (key) is open, because current cannot cross the non-conductive gap between the traces on the bottom layer. However, when the top layer is pressed down (with a finger), it makes contact with the bottom layer. The conductive traces on the underside of the top layer can then bridge the gap, allowing current to flow. The switch is now "closed", and the parent device registers a keypress.

Many applications benefit from the sealed nature of the membrane keypad. Feedback can easily be provided to the user via audible means (e.g. a beep) or visually (lights or via the display itself), or via both means together. For additional wear resistance, a simple, easily replaceable protective clear sheet can be placed in front of the membrane. Membrane keyboards are widely used in consumer electronics, industrial, commercial, scientific and military equipment.

See also
 Chiclet keyboard
 Keyboard technology

Computer keyboard types